Carlos Rafael Castillo Rosales (born 14 September 1977) is a Guatemalan football midfielder who currently plays for Municipal in the Guatemala's top division.

Club career
Castillo started his professional career at local giants Municipal but had a longer spell at Xelajú MC and then CD Suchitepéquez. He returned to Municipal in summer 2010.

International career
He made his debut for Guatemala in an October 2004 friendly match against Jamaica and, as of August 2010, has earned a total of 25 caps, scoring one goal. He has represented his country in 7 FIFA World Cup qualification match and played at the 2005 and 2009 UNCAF Nations Cups.

International goals
Scores and results list. Guatemala's goal tally first.

References

External links
 
 Player profile - CSD Municipal

1977 births
Living people
Sportspeople from Guatemala City
Guatemalan footballers
Guatemala international footballers
C.S.D. Municipal players
Xelajú MC players
C.D. Suchitepéquez players
2005 UNCAF Nations Cup players
2009 UNCAF Nations Cup players
Association football midfielders